The men's individual pursuit event in cycling at the 2004 Summer Olympics consisted of matches between two cyclists.  The riders would start at opposite ends of the track.  Each had 16 laps (4 kilometres) in which to catch the other cyclist.  If neither was caught before one had gone 16 laps, the times for the distance were used to determine the victor.  In the thirteen matches of the 2004 event, no cyclist was lapped.

Medalists

Records

Results

Qualifying round
20 August, 16:30

The sixteen riders raced against each other in matches of two.  Qualification for the next round was not based on who won those matches, however.  The cyclists with the eight fastest times advanced, regardless of whether they won or lost their match.

Match round
In the first round of actual match competition, cyclists were seeded into matches based on their times from the qualifying round.  The fastest cyclist faced the eighth-fastest, the second-fastest faced the third, and so forth.  Winners advanced to the finals while losers in each match received a final ranking based on their time in the round.

Heat 1

Heat 2

Heat 3

Heat 4

Medal round
Cyclists were again re-seeded, this time based on their times in the match round.  The third- and fourth-fastest riders faced off in the bronze medal match, while the fastest two riders competed for the gold and silver medals.

Bronze medal match

Gold medal match
In a reversal of the 2002 Commonwealth Games final, where McGee had caught Wiggins before the end, the Brit took the title to make up for the disappointment of his teammate losing the bronze medal match.

Final classification
The final results were

Did not start:

References

External links
Official Olympic Report

M
Cycling at the Summer Olympics – Men's individual pursuit
Track cycling at the 2004 Summer Olympics
Men's events at the 2004 Summer Olympics